The Little Mikwam River is a tributary of the Mikwam River (via Mikwam Lake), flowing into the Cochrane District, Northeastern Ontario, in Canada.

Forestry is the main economic activity of the sector; recreational tourism activities, second. The west side of this slope is served by the Ontario Highway 652.

The surface of the river is usually frozen from early November to mid-May, but safe circulation on the ice generally occurs from mid-November to the end of April.

Geography 
The neighboring hydrographic slopes of the" Little Mikwam River" are:
North side: Mikwam River, Burntbush River;
East side: Porphyry Creek, Mikwam River, Burntbush River;
South side: Porphyry Creek, East Mikwam River;
West side: Mikwam River, Tweed River, Floodwood River.

The "Little Mikwam River" originates at the mouth of a small forest lake.
From its source, the "Little Mikwam river" flows on  according to the following segments:
 in Blakelock Township to the south-east, then forks north-westerly to the south shore of "Little Lake Mikwam";
 westward through the "Little Lake Mikwam";
 to South-West, up to the mouth.

Toponymy 
The following names are of the same origin and are in the same area of the Cochrane District: Mikwam River, Little Wikwam River, East Mikwam River, Mikwam Lake, Mikwam Lake, Mikwam Lake superior.

See also 

Mikwam River, a river
Burntbush River, a watercourse
Turgeon River, a stream
Harricana River, a watercourse
James Bay
Cochrane District (Ontario)
Northeastern Ontario
List of rivers of Ontario

References

External links 

Rivers of Cochrane District